Padre Hurtado is a Chilean commune in the Talagante Province, in the Metropolitan Region. Part of the Greater Santiago conurbation and one of the outermost communes of it, the commune is named after Saint Alberto Hurtado, who was popularly known as Padre Hurtado ("Father Hurtado").

Demographics
Of these, 34,257 (88.4%) lived in urban areas and 4,511 (11.6%) in rural areas. The population grew by 32% (9,396 persons) between the 1992 and 2002 censuses.

Stats
Population: 45.529 (2006 projection)
Average annual household income: US$14,278 (PPP, 2006)
Population below poverty line: 18.7% (2006)

Administration
As a commune, Padre Hurtado is a third-level administrative division of Chile administered by a municipal council, headed by an alcalde who is directly elected every four years. The 2012-2016 alcalde is José Miguel Arellano Merino (RN). The communal council has the following members:
 Maricel Arellano Merino (RN)
 Paz González Zuñiga (UDI)
 Patricio Muñoz Vegas (PPD)
 Rosa Verdugo Painemal (PRI)
 Alberto Haddad Valech (RN)
 Miguel Ramos Pino (PS)

Within the electoral divisions of Chile, Padre Hurtado is represented in the Chamber of Deputies by Denise Pascal (PS) and Gonzalo Uriarte (UDI) as part of the 31st electoral district, (together with Talagante, Peñaflor, El Monte, Isla de Maipo, Melipilla, María Pinto, Curacaví, Alhué and San Pedro). The commune is represented in the Senate by Guido Girardi Lavín (PPD) and Jovino Novoa Vásquez (UDI) as part of the 7th senatorial constituency (Santiago-West).

References

External links
  Municipality of Padre Hurtado

Geography of Santiago, Chile
Communes of Chile
Populated places in Talagante Province
1891 establishments in Chile